The seventh season of South Park, an American animated television series created by Trey Parker and Matt Stone, began airing on March 19, 2003. The seventh season concluded after 15 episodes on December 17, 2003, and was written and directed by Trey Parker. 

This is the last season to feature Eliza Schneider as the majority of female characters, as she left over a contract dispute.

Episodes

References

External links

 South Park Studios - official website with streaming video of full episodes.
 The Comedy Network - full episodes for Canada

 
2003 American television seasons